2016–17 Malaysia Purple League (also known as SS Purple League for sponsorship reasons) is the third edition of Malaysia Purple League. It started on 12 December 2016 and concluded on 12 February 2017. It consisted of 45 league ties (each tie consisting of 5 matches) in Stage 1. Top six teams in Stage 1, then progressing to the finals stage.

Squads

Stage 1

Standings

Fixtures

Round-robin

Source: BAM TS website

7th–10th place playoff

Finals stage

Final standings

References

External links
 Tournament Link

2016 in badminton
2017 in badminton
2016 in Malaysian sport
2017 in Malaysian sport
Badminton tournaments in Malaysia